Eiszeit (German for "Ice age") is the fourth album by German Neue Deutsche Härte band Eisbrecher. It was released on 16 April 2010 in Germany and on 8 June 2010 in the United States.

Release
The album is available in three editions – a standard edition with ten songs, a deluxe edition with a bonus track and two remixes, and a limited edition with the bonus tracks from the deluxe edition and footage from a 2009 live performance in Stuttgart. The US release features the same tracks as the deluxe edition but has a different remix of the song "Amok".

Track listing

Bonus tracks

Bonus DVD

Personnel
 Alexander Wesselsky – vocals
 Noel Pix – all instruments and production
 Henning Verlage – keyboards on "Eiszeit"; additional programing on tracks 1, 5, 8 and 10; additional guitars on tracks 2 and 5
 Max Schuar – additional keyboards and programing on tracks 3, 6, 7, 10 and 11; additional guitar on "Segne deinen Schmerz"

Charts

Germany – #5
Austria – #34
Switzerland – #76
European Top 100 – #25

References

Eisbrecher albums
2010 albums
AFM Records albums
German-language albums